Keyseria is an extinct genus of dicynodont therapsid. The type species K. benjamini was first named in 1948 as Dicynodon benjamini.

References

Dicynodonts
Anomodont genera